The 1921 Washington Sun Dodgers football team was an American football team that represented the University of Washington during the 1921 college football season. In its first season under head coach Enoch Bagshaw, the team compiled a 3–4–1 record, finished in last place in the Pacific Coast Conference, and was outscored by its opponents by a combined total of 145 to 69. Ray Eckmann was the team captain.

Schedule

References

Washington
Washington Huskies football seasons
Washington Sun Dodgers football